Jan Zákostelský (born 25 November 1991) is a Czech football forward who currently plays for FK Zbuzany 1953 on loan from Slavoj Vyšehrad.

His father Luboš Zákostelský was also a football player.

External links 
 Guardian Stats Centre
 Profile at iDNES.cz

1991 births
People from Benešov
Living people
Czech footballers
Association football forwards
SK Slavia Prague players
FC Sellier & Bellot Vlašim players
SK Benešov players
Czech First League players
Czech National Football League players
Sportspeople from the Central Bohemian Region